Sisurcana paenulata is a species of moth of the family Tortricidae. It is found in Morona-Santiago Province, Ecuador.

References

Moths described in 2004
Sisurcana
Moths of South America
Taxa named by Józef Razowski